Higher Education and Research Opportunities in the UK (HERO) is the official gateway website of the UK's higher education system and introduces the research organisations and bodies of the UK. As of November 2010, the site is closed. 

The idea of a single site to promote the UK's higher education system was discussed by stakeholders in the UK higher education sector resulting in the idea of a "UK HE Mall" website.

The rationale for the site is that the UK's education system comprises autonomous bodies.

The UK HE Mall proposal was developed into the HERO website, launched in November 2000, which is produced by HERO Ltd, an internet publishing company based in Newcastle upon Tyne.

The site does not carry advertising and is grant funded by the main UK higher education funding councils (the Higher Education Funding Council for England (HEFCE), The Higher Education Funding Council for Wales (HEFCW), The Scottish Funding Council (SFC) and the Department for Employment and Learning (DEL) in Northern Ireland, alongside Guild HE (Formerly SCOP), the Universities and Colleges Admissions Service (UCAS) and Universities UK (UUK).

The UK's research councils were stakeholders in the site but now produce their own Research Councils UK (RCUK) site. The Training and Development Agency for Schools and Graduate Prospects are also former stakeholders.

External links 

 

Tertiary educational websites
Higher education in the United Kingdom
Defunct websites